Indigenous peoples lived in the area now known as Texas long before Spanish explorers arrived in the area. However, once Spaniards arrived and claimed the area for Spain, a process known as mestizaje occurred, in which Spaniards and Native Americans had mestizo children who had both Spanish and indigenous blood. Texas was ruled by Spain as part of its New Spain territory from 1520, when Spaniards first arrived in Mexico in 1520, until Texas won independence from Mexico in 1836, which led to the Treaty of Guadalupe-Hidalgo (1848). In 1830, the Mexican population fell to 20 percent and in 1840 down to 10 percent. When Spanish rule in Texas ended, Mexicans in Texas numbered 5,000. In 1850 over 14,000 Texas residents had Mexican origin.  During the Mexican Revolution (1910-1920) had brought in a lot of movement of Mexicans into Texas, passing through the Rio Grande. Most working opportunities for the Mexicans was working on a ranch or a farm starting from South Texas and ending up in the Panhandle in Northwest Texas to cotton lands. By (1930) the Mexican population grew to approximately 700,000. 

In the 2020 Census, 33.3% of Texans identified as "Mexican, Mexican Am., or Chicano".

Media
La Prensa was a daily Spanish language newspaper published in San Antonio. It was started in 1913 by Ignacio E. Lozano and covered the Mexican Revolution and other stories from Mexico. It was closed in 1963.
El Bejarano (San Antonio) was a Spanish language newspaper published in San Antonio. It was started in 1855 and became a platform for Mexican and Mexican American activism.

Notable persons
Plácido Benavides
José Antonio Burciaga
José María Jesús Carbajal
Patricia de la Garza De León
 Martín De León
 Luis Jiménez
Rafael Manchola
 Octavio Medellín
 George I. Sánchez
 Edgar Valdez Villarreal
 Judith Zaffirini
 Selena
 Gloria Anzaldúa

Geography

Hispanics of Mexican descent dominate southern, south-central, and western Texas and form a significant portion of the residents in the cities of Dallas, Houston, Austin, and San Antonio.  The Hispanic population contributes to Texas having a younger population than the American average, because Hispanic births have outnumbered non-Hispanic white births since the early 1990s. In 2007, for the first time since the early nineteenth century, Hispanics accounted for more than half of all births (50.2%), while non-Hispanic whites accounted for just (34%).

Lynching of Mexican-Americans in Texas

From 1848 to 1928 there were hundreds of lynchings of Mexican-Americans across the American West. Many of these lynchings occurred in Texas against people of Mexican descent.  One such case was the case of Paulino Serda of Edinburg, a city in south Texas. Paulino Serda was killed by Texas Rangers on his ranch in 1915 during questioning. In September of that same year, Texas Rangers encountered Jesus Bazan and Antonio Longoria riding their horses near their ranch in Edinburg, Texas. Even though they had committed no crimes, the Texas Rangers shot and killed the two men on the assumption that were Mexican bandit sympathizers; they left their bodies where they were shot to be found by locals two days later. Many more Mexican nationals and Mexican-Americans living in the Texas-Mexico border were killed during this period, now designated as La Matanza.

See also

 Hispanic and Latino Americans in Texas
 History of the African-Americans in Texas
 Jewish history in Texas
 German Texan
 Tejano
 Tex-Mex

References

6.  Kanellos, Nicolas and Helvetia Martell.  'Hispanic Periodicals in the United States Origins to 1960s: A Brief History and Comprehensive Bibliography'. Arte Publico Press, 1960.

Further reading
 McKenzie, Phyllis. The Mexican Texans. Texas A&M University Press, March 1, 2004. , 9781585443079.
 Anglos and Mexicans in the Making of Texas, 1836-1986
 "Let All of Them Take Heed"
 Tejano South Texas

External links
 "Mexican Americans." Handbook of Texas.

Mexican-Americans
Mexican-American history